The Eternal Three is a 1923 American silent drama film produced and distributed by Goldwyn Pictures. It was directed by both Marshall Neilan and Frank Urson. Hobart Bosworth, Claire Windsor, and Bessie Love star.

The film was made from a screen story by Neilan and is now a lost film, although a brief production scene of director Marshall Neilan with stars Raymond Griffith, Hobart Bosworth, and Claire Windsor appear in the restored film Souls for Sale.

Plot 
Dr. Frank R. Walters (Bosworth) is a prominent brain surgeon whose career drives him to neglect his younger wife (Windsor) and foster son Leonard (Griffith). Leonard seduces both his father's wife and secretary Hilda (Love). When Leonard is injured in an automobile accident, his father operates on him, but then sends him away to Europe. Dr. Walters is resolved to spend more time with his wife.

Cast

Production 
The snow scenes were filmed in Bryce Canyon City, Utah, and other scenes were filmed in Mexico City and Chapultepec.

Reception 
The film received mixed reviews.

References

External links 

 
 
 
 Still featuring Bessie Love in bed
 Lobby card featuring Bessie Love and Claire Windsor
 Picture card with Ray Griffith and Hobart Bosworth
 Stills from the film at the Claire Windsor website

1923 drama films
1923 lost films
1923 films
American black-and-white films
Silent American drama films
American silent feature films
Films directed by Marshall Neilan
Films shot in Mexico City
Films shot in Utah
Goldwyn Pictures films
Lost American films
Lost drama films
1920s American films